Glen Eyrie is an English Tudor-style castle built in 1871 by General William Jackson Palmer, the founder of Colorado Springs. There are 17 guest rooms (12 Deluxe guest rooms and 5 premier guest rooms) in the castle, as well as 7 meeting rooms including the Castle Great Hall (2200-square-foot room that can hold up to 240 people) and 2 dining rooms (the Castle King James Hall has seating for 180 people and the Castle Music & Library rooms for seating for up to 58 people). This house was his and his wife's dream home, and is  near Colorado Springs in the northwest foothills just north of the Garden of the Gods rock formations (now a city park). After building a large carriage house where the family lived for a time, Palmer and his wife Mary "Queen" Mellen built a 22-room frame house on the  estate. This house was remodeled in 1881 to include a tower and additional rooms, and made to resemble a stone castle in 1903, reminiscent of those native to England.

Queen Palmer, at age 21, opened the first public school in Colorado Springs in November 1871. The Palmers had three daughters, Elsie, Dorothy, and Marjory.

In 1880, Mrs. Palmer suffered a mild heart attack and was advised to move to a lower altitude. She and the girls moved to the East Coast and then to England where General Palmer visited them as often as he could. Queen died on December 27, 1894, at the age of 44. In sorrow, General Palmer went to England to return Mrs. Palmer's remains and the girls to Colorado Springs.  At that time they decided to tear down their home and, in memory of his wife because she so enjoyed the feel of a castle home, they re-built the 33,000-square-foot castle.

Glen Eyrie's use today
Glen Eyrie is an English Tudor-style castle built by General William Jackson Palmer, the founder of Colorado Springs. There are 17 guest rooms in the castle, as well as 4 meeting rooms, 2 dining rooms, and 24 fireplaces. The castle has several features that were advanced for its time, including a primitive intercom system and a two chimney system operated by a lever that would direct the smoke depending on what direction the  wind was blowing to take the smoke out of the valley. And in case of fires there also were fire hose stations places throughout the castle. Glen Eyrie is on the National Register of Historic Places. 

The castle is now owned by The Navigators. It is open for public tours and events, and can be rented for private programs.

Events hosted at the castle include English and Victorian teas throughout the week and Christmas Madrigal Banquets beginning after Thanksgiving. Glen Eyrie also puts on marriage getaways, men's retreats, women's retreats, family conferences, and much more.  To check on their upcoming programs and different retreats, visit their website.

Glen Eyrie's location at the base of Queen's Canyon leaves it vulnerable to flash floods, a risk that increased after the 2012 Waldo Canyon Fire. The fire did no damage to the Glen Eyrie grounds, but it stripped the vegetation from Queen's Canyon. Over a million dollars in flood mitigation has since provided two debris nets and a wider, deeper, concrete-and-cinder-block-reinforced creek bed, which allows water to flow at 2,000 cubic feet per second through the grounds at Glen Eyrie.

See also
National Register of Historic Places listings in El Paso County, Colorado

References

External links 

Navigators/Glen Eyrie official site

Houses on the National Register of Historic Places in Colorado
Castles in the United States
Buildings and structures in Colorado Springs, Colorado
Tourist attractions in Colorado Springs, Colorado
Houses in El Paso County, Colorado
Tudor Revival architecture in Colorado
National Register of Historic Places in Colorado Springs, Colorado
1871 establishments in Colorado Territory